George Mastrovich (February 23, 1886 – February 20, 1974) was an American gymnast. He competed in three events at the 1904 Summer Olympics.

References

1886 births
1974 deaths
American male artistic gymnasts
Olympic gymnasts of the United States
Gymnasts at the 1904 Summer Olympics
Sportspeople from San Antonio